The third season of Private Practice premiered on October 1, 2009 and concluded on May 13, 2010. The season consisted of 23 episodes.

Plot
In the third season, Violet survives from the cliffhanger from season two thanks to Pete, Naomi and Addison. She gives Pete their baby, Lucas, while she recovers from the ordeal. Addison and Sam get even closer and develop feelings for each other, but decide not to become a couple because they don't want to hurt Naomi. Charlotte and Cooper break up, and Dell loses Heather in an explosion which nearly kills Betsey also.

Sam and Naomi's daughter, Maya, gets pregnant and marries the father of her baby, Dink. Addison and Pete become a couple, which causes Addison to get close to Lucas until Violet wants him back, even going as far as taking Pete to court to get joint custody. Sheldon starts to fall for Charlotte after they start to sleep together.

In the season finale, Addison and Sam finally get together while Charlotte and Cooper get engaged much to Sheldon's dismay. Pete and Violet work over their issues, while Dell and Maya get involved in a car accident and the severity of Dell's condition is overlooked. Dr. Amelia Shepherd, younger sister of Derek Shepherd (Addison's ex-husband) operated on him, having just arrived in town. She was unable to resuscitate him following heart failure. Maya survived her operation to save her spinal cord and prevent paralysis while at the same time she gives birth to a girl, who also survives the ordeal.

Cast and characters

Main cast
 Kate Walsh as Addison Montgomery
 Tim Daly as Pete Wilder
 Audra McDonald as Naomi Bennett
 Paul Adelstein as Cooper Freedman
 KaDee Strickland as Charlotte King
 Chris Lowell as Dell Parker
 Taye Diggs as Sam Bennett
 Amy Brenneman as Violet Turner

Also starring
 Brian Benben as Sheldon Wallace

Recurring cast
 Geffri Maya as Maya Bennett
 Hailey Sole as Betsey Parker
 James Morrison as William White, Ryan Leitsch
 Amanda Detmer as Morgan Barnes
 Agnes Bruckner as Heather
 Amanda Foreman as Katie Kent
 Michael Patrick Thornton as Gabriel Fife
 Christina Chang as Vanessa Hoyt
 Stephen Lunsford as Filmore "Dink" Davis
 Stephen Collins as "The Captain" Montgomery
 Caterina Scorsone as Amelia Shepherd
 Sean Bridgers as Frank

Special guest stars
 Chandra Wilson as Miranda Bailey
 Eric Dane as Mark Sloan

Guest stars
 JoBeth Williams as Bizzy Montgomery
 Rosanna Arquette as Corinne, Dink's mother

Episodes

<onlyinclude>{{Episode table |background=#8B008B |overall=5 |season=5 |title=28 |director=14 |writer=25 |airdate=14 |viewers=9 |country=US |episodes=

{{Episode list/sublist|Private Practice (season 3)
 |EpisodeNumber=34
 |EpisodeNumber2=3
 |Title= Right Here, Right Now
 |WrittenBy=Dana Baratta
 |DirectedBy=Rob Corn
 |OriginalAirDate=
 |Aux4=10.36
 |ShortSummary= Miranda Bailey (Grey's Anatomy'''s Chandra Wilson) brings Izzie Stevens (Katherine Heigl)'s kidney patient, Sarah Freemont (Alexie Gilmore) to Los Angeles, but she comes into conflict with Sam when the only possible donor is Sarah's HIV-positive sister, Emily (Joey Honsa). Meanwhile the consequences of Addison's emotional affair with Noah catch up with her. As Violet returns to work for the first time since her attack, Sheldon and Pete finally discover who the father of her baby is. Cooper and Pete try and help their patient attend his school dance with his girlfriend and share their first kiss.

This episode concludes a patient crossover which began on Grey's Anatomy with the sixth season episode "Invasion". Chandra Wilson and patient guest star, Alexie Gilmore appear in both parts as Miranda Bailey and Sarah Freemont respectively.
|LineColor       = 8B008B
}}

}}</onlyinclude>

Ratings

U.S.

United Kingdom
In the third season, Private Practice'' aired on Thursdays at 10pm on Living, with the episode airing again (which aired that night) on Living+1 an hour later. The season averaged 251,000 viewers, 29% less than the second season.

a Viewers in thousands.
b Ranks for specific channel only.

DVD release

References

2009 American television seasons
2010 American television seasons
Private Practice (TV series) seasons